Charles Tate Regan FRS (1 February 1878 – 12 January 1943) was a British ichthyologist, working mainly around the beginning of the 20th century. He did extensive work on fish classification schemes.

Born in Sherborne, Dorset, he was educated at Derby School and Queens' College, Cambridge and in 1901 joined the staff of the Natural History Museum, where he became Keeper of Zoology, and later director of the entire museum, in which role he served from 1927 to 1938.

Regan was elected Fellow of the Royal Society in 1917.

Regan mentored a number of scientists, among them Ethelwynn Trewavas, who continued his work at the British Natural History Museum.

Taxon described by him
See :Category:Taxa named by Charles Tate Regan
Among the species he described is the Siamese fighting fish (Betta splendens). In turn, a number of fish species have been named regani in his honour:

Taxon named in his honor 
A Thorny Catfish Anadoras regani (Steindachner, 1908)
The Dwarf Cichlid Apistogramma regani
Apogon regani
A Catfish Astroblepus regani
A Dragonet Callionymus regani
The Pink Flabby Whalefish Cetostoma regani
Crenicichla regani
Diaphus regani Tåning, 1932, the Regan's lanternfish, is a species of lanternfish 
found in the Atlantic and Indian Oceans.
Engyprosopon regani
Gambusia regani

Hemipsilichthys regani
The Izak Catshark Holohalaelurus regani
Hoplichthys regani
Hypostomus regani
Julidochromis regani
Lycozoarces regani
The Icefish Neosalanx regani
The Orkney Charr Salvelinus inframundus
Symphurus regani
Trichomycterus regani
Tylochromis regani
Vieja regani
Zebrias regani

References

Further reading
Regan, C. T. (1908) "A revision of the British and Irish fishes of the genus Coregonus " Annals and Magazine of Natural History 2, 482–490
Regan, C. T. (1911) The Freshwater Fishes of the British Isles Methuen & Co. Ltd.: London

1878 births
1943 deaths
British ichthyologists
English taxonomists
English ichthyologists
English zoologists
Directors of the Natural History Museum, London
Fellows of the Royal Society
Alumni of Queens' College, Cambridge
People educated at Derby School
People from Sherborne
 01
20th-century British zoologists